This is a list of institutions of higher education in Rajasthan.

Universities

Central Universities
  Central University of Rajasthan, Kishangarh.

Government State Universities

Multidisciplinary
 Govind Guru Tribal University, Banswara
 Jagadguru Ramanandacharya Rajasthan Sanskrit University, Jaipur
 Jai Narain Vyas University, Jodhpur
 Maharaja Ganga Singh University, Bikaner
 Maharaja Surajmal Brij University, Bharatpur, Bharatpur
 Maharshi Dayanand Saraswati University, Ajmer
 Mohanlal Sukhadia University, Udaipur
 Pandit Deendayal Upadhyaya Shekhawati University, Sikar
 Raj Rishi Bhartrihari Matsya University, Alwar
 Sardar Patel University of Police, Security and Criminal Justice, Jodhpur
 University of Kota
 University of Rajasthan, Jaipur
 Maulana Azad University, Jodhpur

Technology
 Bikaner Technical University, Bikaner
 Rajasthan Technical University, Kota
  M.B.M. University,  Jodhpur

Medicine
 Dr. Sarvepalli Radhakrishnan Rajasthan Ayurved University, Jodhpur
 Rajasthan University of Health Sciences, Jaipur

Agriculture
 Agriculture University, Jodhpur, Jodhpur
 Agriculture University, Kota, Kota
 Maharana Pratap University of Agriculture and Technology, Udaipur
 Sri Karan Narendra Agriculture University, Jobner
 Swami Keshwanand Rajasthan Agricultural University, Bikaner

Veterinary science
 Rajasthan University of Veterinary and Animal Sciences, Bikaner

Law
 National Law University, Jodhpur
 Dr. Bhimrao Ambedkar Law University, Jaipur, Rajasthan

Media
 Haridev Joshi University of Journalism and Mass Communication, Jaipur

Open Universities
 Vardhaman Mahaveer Open University, Kota

Private State Universities

 Amity University Rajasthan, Jaipur
 Apex University, Jaipur
 Bhagwant University, Ajmer
 Dr. K.N.Modi University, Niwai, Tonk
 Geetanjali University , Udaipur
 Gyan Vihar University, Jaipur
 Jagannath University, Chakshu, Jaipur
 Jaipur National University, Jaipur
 JECRC University, Jaipur
 JK Lakshmipat University, Jaipur
 Jodhpur National University, Jodhpur
 LNM Institute of Information Technology , Jaipur
 Madhav University, Abu Road 
 Manipal University Jaipur
 Mewar University, Chittorgarh
 Mody University, Laxmangarh, Sikar
 NIIT University, Neemrana
 NIMS University, Sobha Nagar, Jaipur
 OPJS University, Churu, Rajasthan
 Pacific Academy of Higher Education and Research Udaipur, Udaipur
 Pacific Medical University, Udaipur
 Poornima University, Jaipur 
 RNB Global University, Bikaner
 Shri Khushan Das University, Hanumangarh
Shyam University, Lalsot, Dausa
 Singhania University, Pacheri Bari, Jhunjhunu
 Sunrise University, Alwar
 Suresh Gyan Vihar University, Jaipur
 University of Engineering & Management (UEM), Jaipur
 Vivekananda Global University, Jagatpura, Jaipur

Deemed Universities
, there are seven deemed universities in Rajasthan.

Banasthali Vidyapith, Vanasthali
Birla Institute of Technology and Science, Pilani
IIS University, Jaipur
Institute of Advanced Studies in Education, Sardarshahar
Jain Vishva Bharati University, Ladnu
Janardan Rai Nagar Rajasthan Vidyapeeth University, Udaipur
LNM Institute of Information Technology, Jaipur

AIIMS
 All India Institute of Medical Sciences Jodhpur

IITs
 Indian Institute of Technology Jodhpur

IIM
Indian Institute of Management Udaipur

NITs
 Malaviya National Institute of Technology, Jaipur

IIITs
 Indian Institute of Information Technology, Kota

NIFTs
 National Institute of Fashion Technology, Jodhpur

Colleges
Note: this is an incomplete list. There are over 200 colleges affiliated to Rajasthan Technical University.

Private engineering colleges
 Arya Group of Colleges, Jaipur
 Arya Institute of Engineering and Technology, Jaipur
 Compucom Institute of Information Technology and Management (Ciitm), Jaipur
 Jaipur Engineering College, Kukas
 Jodhpur Institute of Engineering & Technology
 Laxmi Devi Institute of Engineering and Technology, Alwar
 Maharishi Arvind Institute of Engineering and Technology
 Poornima College Of Engineering, Jaipur
 Regional College for Education Research and Technology, Jaipur
 SMCET - Engineering College in Jaipur
 University of Engineering & Management (UEM), Jaipur
 Yagyavalkya Institute of Technology, Jaipur

Medicine

Government medical colleges
Dr. S.N. Medical College, Jodhpur
Government Medical College, Kota
Government Medical College, Dungarpur
Jawaharlal Nehru Medical College, Ajmer
Jhalawar Medical College, Jhalawar
Rabindranath Tagore Medical College, Udaipur
Sardar Patel Medical College, Bikaner
Sawai ManSingh Medical College, Jaipur
Shri Kalyan Government Medical College, Sikar

Private medical colleges
Arid Forest Research Institute (AFRI), Jodhpur
Geetanjali Medical College, Udaipur
Pacific Medical College and Hospital, Udaipur
Private Pharmacy Colleges

 Regional College of Pharmacy, Jaipur
 Sanjeevan College of Pharmacy
 Deepshikha College of Pharmacy

Private Management Colleges
Jaipuria Institute of Management , Jaipur
Faculty of Management Studies – Institute of Rural Management, Jaipur (FMS-IRM)
IPS Business School, Jaipur
Taxila Business School, Jaipur

References

External links
University Grants Commission (India)
All India Council for Technical Education (AICTE)
Free Job Alert Rajasthan

Rajasthan